Frances Sidney may refer to:
Frances Sidney, Countess of Sussex (1531–1589)
Frances Walsingham, married name Frances Sidney (1561–1631)